Hagfors Municipality (Hagfors kommun) is a municipality in Värmland County in west central Sweden. Its seat is located in the city of Hagfors.

The present municipality was created in 1974, when the City of Hagfors (itself instituted as a municipal entity in 1950 as one of the last cities in Sweden) was amalgamated with three rural municipalities.

Being sparsely populated, Hagfors Municipality has natural areas that offer good fishing, canoeing and wildlife.

Localities
Bergsäng
Edebäck
Ekshärad
Geijersholm 	
Hagfors (seat)
Mjönäs 		
Råda 	
Sunnemo 	
Uddeholm

References

External links
 
Hagfors Municipality - Official site
Uddeholm Tooling AB 

Municipalities of Värmland County